The 2017 FIA World Endurance Championship was the sixth season of the FIA World Endurance Championship, an auto racing series co-organised by the Fédération Internationale de l'Automobile (FIA) and the Automobile Club de l'Ouest (ACO).  The series is open to Le Mans Prototypes and grand tourer-style racing cars divided into four categories.  The season began at the Silverstone Circuit in April and will end at the Bahrain International Circuit in November, and include the 85th running of the 24 Hours of Le Mans.  World championship titles will be awarded to the leading prototype drivers and manufacturers, while for the first time in the World Endurance Championship the leading grand touring drivers and manufacturers will also be awarded a world championship.

Following the 6 Hours of Fuji, the #2 Porsche drivers Timo Bernhard, Earl Bamber, and Brendon Hartley currently lead the World Endurance Drivers' Championship, the #38 Jackie Chan DC Racing crew of Ho-Pin Tung, Oliver Jarvis and Thomas Laurent lead the Endurance Trophies for LMP2 Drivers and Teams, the #51 AF Corse duo James Calado and Alessandro Pier Guidi lead the GT World Endurance Drivers' and Teams Championships, and the Proton Competition crew of Christian Ried, Marvin Dienst and Matteo Cairoli lead the Endurance Trophy for GTE-Am Drivers. The #61 Clearwater Racing entry leads the Endurance Trophy for GTE-Am Teams. Porsche lead the World Endurance Manufacturers' Championship, while Ferrari leads the GT World Endurance Manufacturers' Championship.

Schedule
The ACO announced a provisional calendar on 22 September 2016, largely identical to the 2016 schedule.  For the upcoming season, the 6 Hours of Nürburgring event is moved one week earlier in the year, in order to avoid a potential clash with the German Grand Prix.  At the same time, for the first time in the history of the WEC, the official pre-season test will not be held at Circuit Paul Ricard in France, and will instead be held at the Autodromo Nazionale Monza in Italy.

Teams and drivers
On 26 October 2016, Audi Sport Team Joest announced its withdrawal from the World Endurance Championship (WEC) at the end of the season.

LMP1

 Robert Kubica was scheduled to compete for the ByKolles Racing Team, but withdrew prior to the start of the season.

LMP2
In accordance with the new Le Mans Prototype LMP2 regulations for 2017, all cars utilise the Gibson GK428 4.2 L V8 engine.

LMGTE Pro

LMGTE Am

Regulation changes
As part of the ACO's 2017 regulations, the LMP2 category has been revamped with the introduction of a single specification motor from Gibson Technology, with increased power output compared to 2016 LMP2s.  Cockpit and chassis designs will also mimic the LMP1 regulations for safety.  The four approved chassis manufacturers were Dallara, Ligier, Oreca and Riley.  Due to the single engine manufacturer, LMP2 teams are allowed an unlimited number of engines during the season.

At the behest of the manufacturers in LMGTE, the World Motor Sport Council approved the promotion of the GT Manufacturers' and Drivers' World Cups to world championship status, on par with the Manufacturers' and Drivers' World Championships for the LMP categories.  LMGTE teams will also be limited to only three tyre compounds over the season, although the third compound does not have to be chosen until Le Mans.  However, teams in LMGTE Pro as well as LMP1, will be limited to four sets of tyres plus two spares at all six-hour races.  LMGTE entries will also no longer incur a penalty for changing an engine between qualifying and the race.

Across all categories, limitations on testing have been decreased in an attempt to lower costs.  Wind tunnel testing has also been further restricted.

Results and standings

Race results
The highest finishing competitor entered in the World Endurance Championship is listed below. Invitational entries may have finished ahead of WEC competitors in individual races.

Entries were required to complete the timed race as well as to complete 70% of the overall winning car's race distance in order to earn championship points. A single bonus point was awarded to the team and all drivers of the pole position car for each category in qualifying. For the 24 Hours of Le Mans, the race result points allocation was doubled. Furthermore, a race must complete three laps under green flag conditions in order for championship points to be awarded.

Driver championships
Four titles are offered to drivers, two with world championship status. The World Endurance Drivers' Championship is reserved for LMP1 and LMP2 drivers while the GT World Endurance Drivers' Championship is available for drivers in the LMGTE categories. An FIA Endurance Trophy is awarded in the LMP2 and in LMGTE Am.  The FIA Endurance Trophy for LMP1 Private Teams Drivers was not rewarded in 2017 due to not meeting the minimum number of entrants.

World Endurance Drivers' Championship

GT World Endurance Drivers' Championship

Endurance Trophy for LMP2 Drivers

Endurance Trophy for LMGTE Am Drivers

Manufacturer championships
Two manufacturers' titles will be contested, one for LMP1s and one for LMGTEs. The World Endurance Manufacturers' Championship is only open to manufacturer entries in the LMP1 category, while the GT World Endurance Manufacturers' Championship allows all entries from registered manufacturers in LMGTE Pro and LMGTE Am to participate. The top two finishing cars from each manufacturer earn points toward their total.

World Endurance Manufacturers' Championship

GT World Endurance Manufacturers' Championship

Team championships
An FIA Endurance Trophy is awarded in the LMP2, LMGTE Pro, and LMGTE Am categories.  A trophy for the private LMP1 teams is not awarded in 2017 due to not meeting the minimum number of entrants.

Endurance Trophy for LMP2 Teams

Endurance Trophy for LMGTE Pro Teams

Endurance Trophy for LMGTE Am Teams

Footnotes

References

External links
 

 
FIA World Endurance Championship seasons
World Endurance Championship